Round House Theatre is a nonprofit theater company based in Bethesda, Maryland.

History
Round House began in 1970 as “Street ’70”, a program by the Montgomery County Department of Recreation that provided educational outreach in the schools and performances throughout the county. 

In 1977, the company moved permanently to the Round House Theatre, located in the former Bushey Drive Elementary School in Silver Spring. 

In 1982, the company was incorporated as a nonprofit under the name "Round House". The company remained a part of the County’s Department of Recreation until 1993, when it became a separate and independent professional theater group.

About
Round House presents a combination of modern classics, new plays, and musicals for approximately 55,000 guests each year. Round House has been nominated for 181 Helen Hayes Awards and has won 39.Round House has also been honored for four consecutive years with the 50/50 Applause Award from the International Center for Women Playwrights.

Round House’s educational programs serve more than 3,000 students at its Education Center in Silver Spring and other schools in Montgomery County. These programs include theatre classes for adults and youth, summer programs for grades K–12, and a teen performance company run by high school students. Round House also organizes Free Play, a program that allows teenagers and college students to attend theatre shows for free.

Round House is a member of the League of Resident Theatres (LORT) and the League of Washington Theatres (LOWT). The theatre is a 501(c)3 not-for-profit organization, with major support from Montgomery County, the Maryland State Arts Council, and the Arts and Humanities Council of Montgomery County.

Productions

2018-19 season 

 Small Mouth Sounds by Bess Wohl
 How I Learned to Drive by Paula Vogel
 Gem of the Ocean by August Wilson
 Oslo by J.T. Rogers
 A Doll's House, Part 2 by Lucas Hnath

2017-2018 season 

 In The Heights by Lin-Manuel Miranda and Quiara Alegría Hudes, Co-Production with Olney Theatre Center
 I'll Get You Back Again by Sarah Gancher
 The Book of Will by Lauren Gunderson
 Handbagged by Moira Buffini, part of the Women's Voices Theater Festival
 "Master Harold" ...and the Boys by Athol Fugard
 The Legend of Georgia McBride by Matthew Lopez

2016-2017 season 
 Angels in America Part I: Millenium Approaches by Tony Kushner, Co-Production with Olney Theatre Center
 Angels in America Part II: Perestroika by Tony Kushner, Co-Production with Olney Theatre Center
 Miss Bennet: Christmas at Pemberley by Lauren Gunderson and Margot Melcon
 Caroline, or Change by Tony Kushner and Jeanine Tesori
 Or, by Liz Duffy Adams
 How I Learned What I Learned by August Wilson, co-conceived by Todd Kreidler

2015-2016 season 

 Ironbound by Martyna Majok, part of the Women's Voices Theater Festival
 The Night Alive by Conor McPherson
 Stage Kiss by Sarah Ruhl
 Father Comes Home from the Wars (Parts 1, 2 & 3) by Suzan-Lori Parks
 Cat on a Hot Tin Roof by Tennessee Williams
 The Who & The What by Ayad Akhtar

2014-2015 season 

 Fool for Love by Sam Shepard
 Fetch Clay, Make Man by Will Power
 The Nutcracker by Tommy Rapley, Jake Minton, Phillip Klapperich, and Kevin O’Donnell
 Rapture, Blister, Burn by Gina Gionfriddo
 Uncle Vanya by Anton Chekhov, new version by Annie Baker
 NSFW by Lucy Kirkwood

See also

 Helen Hayes Award

References

External links
 Official Website

1978 establishments in Maryland
Theatre companies in Maryland
Regional theatre in the United States
League of Resident Theatres
Theatres in Maryland
Members of the Cultural Alliance of Greater Washington
League of Washington Theatres
Tourist attractions in Montgomery County, Maryland
Buildings and structures in Bethesda, Maryland
Buildings and structures in Silver Spring, Maryland